Touhey is a surname. Notable people with the surname include:

 Bill Touhey (1906–1999), Canadian ice hockey player
 Michael J. Touhey (1844–1904), American politician
 Patsy Touhey (1865–1923), American comedian
 Peyton Touhey, fictional character

See also
 Touhy (disambiguation)